The 1952 Volta a Catalunya was the 32nd edition of the Volta a Catalunya cycle race and was held from 7 September to 14 September 1952. The race started in Montjuïc and finished in Barcelona. The race was won by Miguel Poblet.

General classification

References

1952
Volta
1952 in Spanish road cycling
September 1952 sports events in Europe